Myzinum maculatum is a species of wasp in the family Thynnidae. It is used as a biological control of turf grass pests.

References

Further reading

External links

 

Thynnidae
Insects described in 1793
Taxa named by Johan Christian Fabricius